The Drino valley is a valley in southern Albania and northwestern Greece along the Drino river.

Drino valley contains several monasteries, the most important of which dedicated to Saints Quiricus and Julietta.

References

Valleys of Albania
Valleys of Greece
Landforms of Epirus (region)
Geography of Gjirokastër County